is a Japanese table tennis player.

Career highlights
Nagasaki was part of the Japanese women's team that won a silver medal at the 2018 World Team Table Tennis Championships in Halmstad, Sweden.

In December 2019, Nagasaki won both the girls' singles and doubles (with Miyuu Kihara) at the 2019 World Junior Table Tennis Championships. She was the first non-Chinese girl to win the singles in the tournament's 17-year history.

Two weeks later, she and Kihara captured the women's doubles title at the 2019 ITTF World Tour Grand Finals.

Achievements

World Championships
World Team Table Tennis Championships: 2nd (2018)

ITTF and WTT finals

Singles

Women's doubles

Junior records
Singles
World Junior Table Tennis Championships: 1st (2019)
Asian Junior and Cadet Championships: 1st (2019).

Doubles
World Junior Table Tennis Championships: 1st (2019), 3rd (2017, 2018).
Asian Junior and Cadet Championships: 1st (2019), 3rd (2016).

Team
World Junior Table Tennis Championships: 2nd (2018, 2019)
Asian Junior and Cadet Championships: 2nd (2016, 2017), 3rd (2015, 2019).

References

External links
ITTF profile

2002 births
Japanese female table tennis players
Living people
Sportspeople from Kanagawa Prefecture
People from Ebina, Kanagawa
Kinoshita Abyell Kanagawa players
World Table Tennis Championships medalists